Chaetae may refer to:

 Chaetae (town) in ancient Macedon
 Chaeta, an anatomical feature of invertebrates